Dookudu is a 2011 Indian Telugu-language action comedy film directed by Srinu Vaitla and written by Vaitla, Kona Venkat, and Gopimohan. It is produced by Ram Achanta, Gopi Achanta, and Anil Sunkara under the banner 14 Reels Entertainment. The film stars Mahesh Babu, Samantha, Prakash Raj, and Sonu Sood alongside Brahmanandam who played a supporting role. S. Thaman composed the music and M. R. Varma edited the film, while K. V. Guhan handled the cinematography after Prasad Murella left the project in mid-way.

The film revolves around Ajay Kumar (Babu), a police officer and son of ex-MLA Shankar Narayana (Raj), who awakes from coma, but his health remains perilous. To aid his recovery, Kumar masquerades as a Member of the Legislative Assembly fulfilling his father's ambition for him, while also hunting his father's foes. The film began production on 28 June 2010 at Hyderabad. Shooting began on 22 October 2010 in Turkey and lasted till mid-September 2011. The film was predominantly shot in Hyderabad, with portions shot in Mumbai, Gujarat, Istanbul, Dubai, and Switzerland.

The film was released on 23 September 2011 on 1800 screens worldwide. Upon release, Dookudu received positive reviews and was commercially successful. It was cited as "The biggest hit you've never heard of" by the Los Angeles Times. The film collected a distributor share of 57.4crore in its lifetime and grossed more than 101crore in its lifetime making it the highest-grossing Telugu film of that year and the second highest-grossing Telugu film of all time. In addition, the film won various accolades, which include seven Nandi Awards, six Filmfare Awards, eight SIIMA Awards and eight CineMAA Awards. The film is remade in Bengali as Challenge 2 (2012), and in Kannada as Power (2014). The movie was reported to be inspired by the 2003 German movie Good Bye, Lenin!.

Plot 
During the political realm of N. T. Rama Rao, Shankar Narayana is an independent MLA of the constituency of Shankar Nagar, which is named after him, in Hyderabad, and is regarded as a champion for the poor. When a truck collides with the car his brother Satyam and he is in, Shankar goes into a coma. Except for his family, everyone else presumes that he is killed in the accident. His son Ajay is a police officer in Mumbai who fights against the mafia and is on a mission to apprehend Mafia don Nayak who is involved in illegal drug trade, extortion and arms trafficking.

When he heads to Turkey in an undercover operation, he meets Prashanthi, daughter of Ajay's senior police officer and soon falls in love with her. She initially rejects his advances, so he pretends to give up. However, he is successful in the undercover operation and arrests Nayak's brother Bunty. After returning to India, he again meets Prashanthi.  He tells her father to appreciate what she does and not be so strict.  This, to his surprise, makes her reciprocates his feelings. In an attempt to arrest Nayak, Bunty and the police commissioner is killed and Shankar's loyal follower Sivayya reveals to Ajay that Nayak, along with Shankar's rival, Mallesh Goud and Shankar's other followers Meka Narsingh Rao, Ambarpet Ganesh, were behind Shankar's accident, so Ajay plots to kill all of them.

When Shankar comes out of the coma, the doctors who treated him advise his family that his life is at risk if he encounters or hears anything upsetting, disturbing, or shocking. Ajay hides the events surrounding the accident and shifts his family to his previously abandoned mansion which is now being used for film-making. Ajay creates a dummy political set-up at this mansion. In the guise of a reality television program, Ajay tricks an aspiring but unsuccessful film actor Padmasri by making him believe that the television show is being sponsored by actor Akkineni Nagarjuna's television channel and that Nagarjuna wants to offer Padmasri high remuneration for his realistic performance in the show. On the other hand, an aspiring actor Bokka Venkata Rao and Mallesh Goud are tricked by Ajay with a real estate business deal to exploit his criminal nexus.

Ajay keeps this drama under wraps from Shankar by making him believe that Ajay is also an MLA revered by people fulfilling his dad's wishes. He marries Prashanthi after gaining her family's consent much to Shankar's delight. Meanwhile, Ajay manages to kill Ganesh and Mallesh without the knowledge of anybody while Shankar believes that they died due to ailments. Nayak reaches Hyderabad to kill Ajay and Ajay's drama is exposed before everybody except Shankar. Meka Narsingh Rao is killed by Nayak while the latter's henchmen are killed by Ajay and others in an encounter. Nayak is later killed in a Ramlila event. Shankar also learns of Ajay's drama and is happy for the affection his son showed on him.

Cast

Production

Development 
Ram Achanta, Gopi Achanta and Anil Sunkara under the banner 14 Reels Entertainment agreed to bankroll a film directed by Srinu Vaitla starring Mahesh Babu in the lead role after completing their debut venture Namo Venkatesa (2010). Regarding the same, Vaitla said that it would be a romance action film and a majority would be shot in North India using a Super 35. Mahesh Babu's brother Ramesh Babu was a co-producer. Vaitla worked on the script for more than a year and shelved it temporarily for further modification as he felt it became monotonous and resembles his previous work. The film was officially launched on 28 June 2010 in Ramanaidu Studios at Hyderabad.

Kona Venkat wrote the dialogues and Gopimohan penned the screenplay. S. Thaman was selected as the music director marking his first collaboration with Vaitla as the latter's regular music composer Devi Sri Prasad had shortage of dates to accommodate. The film was titled Dookudu in mid September 2010 despite initial reports stating that it may be titled Power. Prasad Murella was selected as the cinematographer who walked out after having an argument on the film's sets with Vaitla because of differences. K. V. Guhan was selected to finish the remaining part. Regarding the same, Vaitla said "I had made family dramas with Prasad before but in Dookudu, the demand increased from my side and we couldn't get in sync with each other. I liked the photography in Athadu done by Guhan. We gelled and he has done a fantastic job."

Casting 
Samantha was selected as the female lead while Sonia Deepti was selected to play the role of her best friend. Srihari was selected for a crucial role but was replaced by Prakash Raj later. Mahesh Babu was reported to be seen as a police officer in the film. Sonu Sood was cast as the antagonist. Earlier, Kajal Aggarwal was rumoured to be the female lead while Venkatesh was rumoured to provide a voice-over. Gopimohan denied the latter's inclusion as a rumour while the former's inclusion remained unconfirmed.

Ravi Prakash was selected for a supporting role. Brahmanandam and M. S. Narayana were also selected for supporting roles. Parvati Melton was selected for an item number. Meenakshi Dixit was selected for performing the title song. Regarding the limited role of Samantha, Vaitla clarified that a lot depended on the film's subject and it was done mainly to develop the chemistry between the lead pair.

Filming 

Principal photography began on 22 October 2010 in Turkey where a few action sequences and a song on Babu and Samantha were shot. The schedule lasted till November 2010 and the team returned to India on 10 November 2010. The second schedule was conducted in Dubai. After returning from Dubai, the next schedule began at Hyderabad on 27 November 2010. In mid January 2011, filming then moved to Ramanaidu Studios in Hyderabad. Scenes featuring Babu, Samantha and Deepthi were shot at Levis showroom in Banjara Hills of Hyderabad and the schedule ended on 29 January 2011.

Filming continued in Gujarat where a song on Babu and Samantha was shot at the Little Rann of Kutch. On its completion on 11 February 2011, the next schedule was planned to be shot in Hyderabad from 15 February 2011 to 3 March 2011. The film's unit planned to leave to Chennai on 24 February 2011 for filming a song but the makers opted to shoot the same along with few scenes at Chiran Fort Club in Hyderabad from the next day. Few chase sequences were shot in Old city area of Hyderabad in mid March 2011. Filming continued at Mumbai from 20 March 2011 after a few action sequences in Ramoji Film City. The film was shot at Padmalaya Studios in late April 2011 after which filming was planned at Switzerland where a song and few scenes were shot.

Some scenes were shot in a central jail set erected in Ramoji Film City with which the Hyderabad schedule was completed in mid May 2011. Some comedy and action scenes were shot in the set which was earlier erected for Dhee (2007), Old City and other areas apart from Ramoji Film City. A long schedule was shot in Switzerland later and Babu stayed back for taking rest on the schedule's completion and returned on 30 May 2011 to participate in the shoot from the next day. Due to unforeseen circumstances, the film's shoot was delayed multiple times and by late June 2011, 40 days of shoot was pending.

Key scenes featuring Babu, Brahmanandam, M. S. Narayana and others were shot in a private apartment in Somajiguda in mid July 2011. Few scenes were shot in Jayabheri House in late July 2011. The song "Adara Adara" was shot at Chiran Fort club in late August 2011 under the choreography of Dinesh. The film's climax sequences were shot in early September 2011 at Tolichowki in Hyderabad. A special set was erected at Ramoji Film City for the shoot of the item number on Babu and Melton which began on 6 September 2011. On its completion, the filming came to an end.

Themes and influences 
Many critics have stated that the film's story is inspired by the German tragicomedy Good Bye, Lenin! (2003). Regarding the same, Vaitla said "I saw Good Bye, Lenin! when the scripting of Dookudu was 50 per cent complete. It was a coincidence. I had the idea of showing Mahesh in a new way as a young MLA. I also had the idea of the father. Then, Gopimohan came in, and we worked on the script for seven months. It's a multi-layered film and writing the screenplay for it was tough." He added that the idea of how lies are told and you get people to believe them was already shown in his earlier film Ready (2008). He chose a father-son relationship in the film as he wanted to show the emotions between them. Apart from that, Vaitla was inspired by other small things from Good Bye, Lenin!. One such inspired sequence is where the protagonist and his team create fake news broadcasts and newspapers for showing them to his father to make the drama believable which includes making N. T. Rama Rao the Prime minister of India in 2011. And, the scene where the protagonist lies to his father about few things without knowing that the latter is aware of the drama is inspired from the climax of Good Bye, Lenin!.

A reviewer from Sify felt that some of the scenes and characters are inspired by Babu's previous films Athadu (2005) and Pokiri (2006) apart from the Hindi Patiala House (2011). In one of the comedy scenes, M. S. Narayana is seen performing spoofs of Yamadonga (2007), Magadheera (2009), Simha (2010) and Enthiran (2010). According to K. Moti Gokulsing and Wimal Dissanayake, authors of the book Routledge Handbook of Indian Cinemas, the parodies too received positive response.

Music 

S. Thaman composed the soundtrack which consists of six songs. Viswa and Bhaskarabhatla penned lyrics of one song each while Ramajogayya Sastry penned lyrics for the remaining songs. In mid-June 2011, Thaman planned to record two songs in China and one more song in Czech Republic during the re-recording as some special instruments were not available in India and were exclusively available there. Aditya Music acquired the audio rights. The soundtrack was unveiled by hosting a promotional event at Shilpakala Vedika on 19 August 2011. The event was aired live on MAA TV and on the film's official website from 7:30 pm. The album cover depicts a promotional still of Babu from the film's title song.

The soundtrack was successful in its collections. However, it received mixed response from critics. Suresh Kavirayani of The Times of India called the film's music impressive. A reviewer from IANS felt that "Nee Dookudu" and "Guruvaram" were well shot and composed while the overall music could have been better. Sify wrote "Thaman's music sounded average in the theatres, though a couple of numbers – 'Guruvaram' and 'Dethadi' – could enliven the mood of the spectators. The background score and the music during some romantic moments are dull." IndiaGlitz termed it the first passable album of Thaman and called it a forgettable one.

Telugu

Tamil

Release 
FICUS Inc. acquired the overseas distribution rights. The film was announced to be released on 23 September 2011 by the producers in the end of August 2011 after the release of the soundtrack.

The first copy was submitted to Central Board of Film Certification on 19 September 2011 for censoring. The board awarded an U/A certificate on 21 September 2011 after a few cuts were done. To prevent illegal streaming, the makers approached the High Court for a John Doe order. The film released in 15 screens in Chennai. The film released in 71 screens in Hyderabad surpassing the record set by Magadheera which released in 68 screens.

The film released in 1600 screens worldwide and 89 theatres in North America. It was released in 21 countries including Canada, Trinidad, South Africa, Netherlands and Finland making it the first Telugu film to be released there. It became the first Telugu film to be released in 21 cities in North India. The film released in 79 theatres in the United States. It became the first Telugu film to be released in Botswana. The Telugu Association of Botswana screened it in Village Cinema at 10:30 am on 9 October 2011 with each ticket costing 40 pula. Apart from them, the film released in countries like Singapore, Dubai, Malaysia and United Kingdom while the producers received calls from Nairobi for distribution rights.

Promotion 
The first-look poster featuring Babu with a teaser was unveiled on 31 May 2011 on the eve of the birthday of Babu's father, actor Krishna. The second teaser was unveiled on 9 August 2011 on the eve of Babu's birthday, and it received a positive response from viewers. Melton's look in the item number was unveiled after the completion of the film's shoot and those stills received positive response. In an interview to Karthik Pasupulate of The Times of India, Anil Sunkara said "When the pre-release hype was hitting a fever pitch, we (producers) toured all over the state, meeting fan associations and telling them that it was a family entertainer, and distributing merchandise like stickers, badges and ribbons".

A thanksgiving tour began in Vijayawada where Vaitla, Anil and comedian Siva Reddy promoted the film at Hotel Mid City after which they went to Eluru. The film's success meet was held at Hotel Novotel in Hyderabad on 11 October 2011. Another event was planned at Vijayawada for celebrating the completion of the film's 50-day run. The event was held at Velagapudi Ramakrishna Siddhartha Engineering College grounds on 12 November 2011. Udaya Bhanu hosted the event.

Legal issues 
The film was shot at Vikarabad railway station on 31 July 2011 after seeking necessary permission to shoot till 5:00 pm with police security. The shoot was called off because of rain and Babu left the premises at 4:30 pm. Shortly, seven Telangana Students JAC activists landed at the railway station raising slogans against Samaikhyandhra supporters. On seeing them, the crew started preparing to vacate the spot. While they were leaving, the activists started pelting stones at them. Police later dispersed the mob and production manager Rambabu and Ramesh filed a complaint against them.

The activists disrupted the screening of the film in six theatres in Ranga Reddy district and accused the unit members for registering false cases against them during the film's shoot at a railway station. They entered theatres at Vikarabad, Parigi, Tandoor, Chevella and Shamshabad and asked the managements not to screen the film but were dispersed by the police. Later Rambabu and Ramesh met them and assured them that the cases would be withdrawn immediately. Police protection was given to the theatres screening the film in Hyderabad while the screening was much delayed in many centres in Telangana. The shows began from 6:00 am in all other regions, particularly in the Ceded area.

Home media 
The television broadcast rights were purchased by MAA TV for 54 million. Illegally copied versions of the film's DVDs were seized by the Vijayawada city police on 11 October 2011. Volga Videos released the film's DVD and VCD on 1 January 2012. FICUS Inc., released the overseas DVD on 16 March 2012. The film is also available on Disney+ Hotstar.

Reception

Critical reception 
Suresh Kavirayani of The Times of India rated it 4 out of 5 and wrote "Dookudu is a typical Srinu Vytla film with a generous sprinkling of comedy. His narrative manages to keep the audience engaged until the end of the movie. This movie comes as a blessing for not just Mahesh Babu, but also for Tollywood, which is badly in need of a hit, after the recent spate of box office debacles. Srinu Vytla and Mahesh Babu have come out with a winner in Dookudu". Bollywood Life stated "Dookudu has all the elements of a potboiler – the unholy nexus between underworld and politicos, passionate romance, shrill revenge and the glory of father-son relationship. The movie is almost certain to make a box office splash, but if fans are expecting the lofty fizz of Pokkiri, perhaps there is some disappointment in store". Sify called the film "entertaining" and wrote "Despite the drawbacks, Dookudu holds the power to lure the crowds, with its commercial values. It is a bonanza to Mahesh Babu's fans and it will not disappoint the family crowds either." IANS rated it 3.5 out of 5 and stated "Dookudu is a treat for Mahesh's fans. But others can also enjoy this film for its comedy elements and Mahesh's powerful presence." Vanshika Devuni of Upperstall.com wrote "The best thing about the movie is that it comes across as a mass entertainer and makes no attempts to come across as  movie or a movie that tries to pretend it is 'hatke'."

In contrast, B. V. S. Prakash of Deccan Chronicle rated the film 3 out of 5 and wrote "Although, it is a tale of an honest cop who is on the trail of a dreaded don, director Sinu Vaitla relies on a band of comedians like Brahmanandam and M.S. Narayana to sustain audience interests, before his protagonist accomplishes his mission. Audiences have to leave behind their thinking caps at home to enjoy this comic-caper since the screenplay has few gaping holes and is repetitive as well." Pavithra Srinivasan of Rediff gave it 2.5 out of 5 and criticised the film's screenplay and logic-defying sequences, but praised Babu's performance, calling his role a "cakewalk" and recommending the film for his fans in particular. Ramchander of Oneindia Entertainment wrote "To sum up, Dookudu is just another average entertainer and not in the same league as Mahesh Babu"s earlier blockbusters like Athadu and Pokiri".

Box office 
Dookudu had the largest opening for a Telugu film, and collected a share of 10.11 crore and a gross of 12.58 crore on the first day of its release. The film grossed nearly 4.5 crore on its first day at the Overseas Box office. The film crossed the $1 million mark in the United States and grossed 1.5 crore in two days, in United Kingdom, Australia, Dubai and Canada. The film's three-day worldwide total became 21.22 crore and in three days, the film surpassed the records set by Magadheera and Simha in terms of first weekend collections. It collected a share of 25.55 crore and grossed 50.07 crore in its first week. The film collected 0.51 crore in its first week at Chennai Box office.

By the end of its second week, Dookudu grossed 70 crore at the worldwide box office. The film grossed 101 crore by the end of its 50-day run at the worldwide Box office. It grossed 80 crore in India and 21 crore in Overseas by the end of its 50-day run. The film completed 50 days in 312 centres and 100 days in 63 centres. The film earned a share of 57.4 crore at the worldwide Box office in its lifetime.

Awards and nominations

Legacy 
Dookudu became one of the biggest hits in the history of Telugu cinema and was the biggest hit in Babu's career by the end of its lifetime run. The film ended the five-year career slump of Babu and marked his image makeover. The Times of India called it one of the top ten must watch Telugu films of 2011. The Los Angeles Times wrote a special article about Babu and the film's massive collections in United States and called the film "The biggest hit you've never heard of". After the film's gross crossed 1 billion, Income Tax Department officials conducted a raid on the Jubilee Hills residence of Babu as he was rumoured to get a remuneration of more than 120 million for his next projects.

The film's success made Samantha one of the most sought heroines in Telugu cinema. Melton received more offers for performing item numbers post the film's release. Dasari Narayana Rao said the film arrived at the right time and had provided a good amount of relief to the Telugu film industry, which was under a huge loss at that point of time. Samantha auctioned the costumes used by Babu in the film for raising funds for the charity organisation "Pratyusha". Vaitla's next film with Babu namely Aagadu (2014), which too was produced by 14 Reels Entertainment and had the same technical crew of this film, was a failure at the box office. The Hindu cited similarities with Dookudu as one of the reasons of the film's failure.

Other versions 
Dookudu was dubbed and released by 14 Reels Entertainment into Tamil entitled Athiradi Vettai and Malayalam entitled Choodan in 2013. The film was also dubbed into Hindi as The Real Tiger in 2012 and into Odia under the same title as the original Telugu version sometime between 2019 and 2020. The film was remade into Bengali as Challenge 2 (2012). The film was also remade into Kannada as Power (2014).

References

Sources

External links 
 

Indian action comedy films
2011 action comedy films
2011 films
Films shot in Gujarat
Telugu films remade in other languages
Fictional portrayals of the Andhra Pradesh Police
2011 masala films
Films shot in Istanbul
Films directed by Srinu Vaitla
Films shot in Hyderabad, India
Films set in Hyderabad, India
Films scored by Thaman S
Films with screenplays by Kona Venkat
Films set in Turkey
Films shot in Switzerland
2011 comedy films
2010s Telugu-language films